The flag of the British Leeward Islands was the flag of the Federal Colony of the Leeward Islands.
It was a Blue Ensign with a badge.  The colonies under the Federal Colony had their own badges from 1909.  The Governor-in-chief of the Leeward Islands used a Union Flag defaced with the coat of arms.

See also
Former parts of the Leeward Islands
Flag of Antigua and Barbuda
Flag of the British Virgin Islands
Flag of Dominica
Flag of Montserrat
Flag of Saint Christopher-Nevis-Anguilla
Flag of Saint Kitts and Nevis
Flag of Anguilla
Flag of the British Windward Islands
Flag of the West Indies Federation

External links

Blue Ensigns
Obsolete national flags
Caribbean culture
Flags displaying animals